7 Dwarves: The Forest Is Not Enough (original German title 7 Zwerge – Der Wald ist nicht genug) is a 2006 German comedy film directed by Sven Unterwaldt. It is a sequel to the film 7 Zwerge – Männer allein im Wald. The film is based on the fairy tale "Rumpelstiltskin" and characters from "Snow White and the Seven Dwarfs".

Plot

Hansel and Gretel are lost in the forest. Gretel thinks to see a dwarf in the bushes but it is a disgusting humanlike creature. It scares Hansel and Gretel who run further into the woods. Not long after, Bubi shows up and asks the creature for his name. The creature only reveals to be "The Evil One" and nobody else knows his real name. Bubi sneakily follows the creature and witnesses how it dances around a fire singing a song in which he mentions his real name.

The story moves to the castle where Snow White lives. She became a mother. Her husband, the jester, left a year ago to buy some cigarettes in a nearby shop. Snow White wonders why this takes so long. The Evil One suddenly enters the castle and claims the child. The day before Spliss, one of Snow White guards, rescued The Evil One from a trap. The Evil One wanted to thank Spliss by giving him a wish. Spliss wished to have a beautiful haircut which he got. However, Spliss did not like the color and wanted to have it blond. The Evil One agreed on condition Spliss signs a contract so Snow White's child will become his property. Snow White asks The Evil One if the contract can be undone. The Evil One agrees nor or less: if someone can reveal his real name within 48 hours, Snow White can keep the child.

Snow White seeks for the dwarves, but is surprised only Bubi still lives in the cabin. Bubi explains this is Snow White her own fault. Some time ago she visited the dwarves telling them her husband is missing. She wanted to find a new man and this could be even a dwarf. There was one main condition: the man must have a successful career. Not much later all dwarves left except Bubi. Snow White is a bit surprised she can't remember her visit. Snow White asks Bubi to reunite the dwarves and to find the name of The Evil One.

The six other dwarves work in a nearby town. Cookie, Cloudy and Sunny have their own inn. Speedy is chief of the fire department. Ralfie works at the brewer. Tschakko exterminates vermin. Bubi finds them all to convince them to help Snow White. According to them, there is only one man who can help them: The Wise Grey. The dwarves can't find him. According his diary, he left for "The Fishing Palace" in another world. The dwarves find the magical mirror which once belonged to the former queen. They jump into the mirror and end up in the other world: modern Germany.

In the meantime, The Evil One arrives at the candy house of the witch, who is actually the former queen. The Evil One follows a therapy. The queen says she cannot remember three things: names, faces and a third other thing she does not know anymore. As the witch always forgets the real name of The Evil One, last one writes it down on a paper: Rumpelstiltskin. He puts the paper in an envelope and hides it in the witch her conjuring book. The Evil One tells Snow White her baby will soon be his although he is afraid someone is in search for his real name. The witch uses her crystal ball and discovers the dwarves set up a mission. As she is still mad on the dwarves and Snow White she sends The Evil One to the other world to boycott the dwarves. The Evil One is gifted: he is a shape shifter.

The dwarves find The Wise Grey in some sort of fish and chips stand. He does know The Evil One but never heard his real name. He does know the dwarves should look for it in the witches' candy house. The dwarves return to their own world by using a magic mirror in the railway station. In meantime, The Evil One tried unsuccessfully to stop the dwarves.

The dwarves head to the candy house where the witch tried to make her invisible. The Evil One is also present. The dwarves use a tricky way to obtain the envelope with The Evil One's real name. They all go to Snow White. However, The Evil One gave the dwarves an envelope with another name so the dwarves think his real name is Mother Hulda. They realize it was not Snow White who visited them to tell she is in search for a new man, but The Evil One. Eventually, Bubi says the real name is Rumpelstiltskin. He knew this the whole time and tried to tell but nobody let him speak. The dwarves also meet their former head dwarf Brummboss who became a king at the end of Männer allein im Wald. The king asks if he can become a dwarf again. This is rejected by the others as there are already seven dwarves.

Cast

References

External links
 

German comedy films
2000s German-language films
2006 films
Films shot in Germany
Films shot in Hamburg
Films shot in Braunschweig
Films based on Rumpelstiltskin
Films based on Snow White
Seven Dwarfs
Films directed by Sven Unterwaldt
2000s German films